John Hugo Pedersen (born 13 July 1961) is a Norwegian former fencer. He competed in the individual and team épée events at the 1984 Summer Olympics.

References

External links
 

1961 births
Living people
Norwegian male épée fencers
Olympic fencers of Norway
Fencers at the 1984 Summer Olympics
People from Moss, Norway
Sportspeople from Viken (county)
20th-century Norwegian people